The 2008 Carlton Football Club season was the Carlton Football Club's 145th season, and 112th as a member of the Australian Football League.

The club saw many changes to key personnel in 2008, with  champion Chris Judd coming to the club as a new captain, former club captain Brett Ratten appointed senior coach, and Stephen Kernahan replacing Richard Pratt as president mid-season.

Carlton finished 11th out of 16 teams with ten wins and twelve losses in the 2008 AFL season. Although this did not result in a finals appearance, the season marked the end of one of the least successful periods in club history, which had seen five finishes in the bottom two between 2002 and 2007.

Club summary
The 2008 AFL season was the 112th season of the VFL/AFL competition since its inception in 1897; and, having competed in every season, it was also the 112th season contested by the Carlton Football Club.

As in previous years, the club's primary home ground was Telstra Dome, with home games expecting to draw larger crowds played at the Melbourne Cricket Ground; the traditional home ground MC Labour Park continued to serve as the training and administrative base. The club's joint major sponsors were telecommunications provider Optus, unchanged from 2007, and car manufacturer Hyundai, newly signed for the 2008 season; it was the start of Hyundai's second long-term stint as a major sponsor of the club, having previously been the major sponsor from 1995 to 1999. As had been the case every year since 2003, Carlton had a full alignment with the Northern Bullants in the Victorian Football League, allowing Carlton-listed players to play with the Bullants when not selected in AFL matches.

Carlton set a new club record membership, with a total of 40,764 members for the season, a significant increase on the previous record, set in 2007, of 35,431. The club's improved onfield performances also resulted an increase in attendances far in excess of those budgeted by the club, allowing the club to post a healthy operating profit for the season.

Senior personnel

Presidency
Businessman and long-time benefactor of the club, Richard Pratt, was president of the club at the beginning of the season. However, he stepped down from the role in June 2008, in order to face criminal charges relating to his packaging business, Visy Industries. Visy and competitor Amcor had been found guilty of price fixing in November 2007, but in June 2008, Pratt was personally charged with giving false and misleading evidence during the Australian Competition & Consumer Commission's investigation of the cartel, and he stepped aside from the football club to face the charges.

Pratt had served as president since February 2007. He was replaced by vice-president and former club captain Stephen Kernahan. The charges against Pratt were ultimately dropped, shortly before his death less than a year later in April 2009.

Senior coach
Denis Pagan, Carlton's appointed senior coach at the start of 2007, had been sacked after Round 16, bringing an end to a 4½ year tenure in the role. Assistant coach and former club captain Brett Ratten, who had stepped in as caretaker coach after Pagan's dismissal, was appointed as the new senior coach for the 2008 season.

In the weeks following Pagan's dismissal, there was intense media speculation surrounding the possibility that former  captain Michael Voss would be appointed as senior coach. Voss had retired from playing after 2006 and had no formal coaching experience, but was at the time considered likely to transition almost immediately into an AFL coaching role. Carlton did approach Voss as a potential candidate, but he withdrew from the selection process relatively early. By the end of the selection process, three potential coaches remained, with Ratten selected ahead of  assistant coach Guy McKenna and  assistant coach Chris Bond. The appointment was formally announced on 20 August 2007, with two matches still remaining in the 2007 season.

Captaincy and leadership
Lance Whitnall, who had served as captain in the 2007 season, was delisted, and Chris Judd was elected to the captaincy in his place, despite having not previously played a game for the Blues. Judd had not been promised the captaincy as part of the conditions to trade him to the club, but his performance during the pre-season convinced the match committee and player group that he should take on the role. Nick Stevens was appointed vice-captain. Andrew Carrazzo, Kade Simpson, Heath Scotland and Brendan Fevola made up the balance of the six-man leadership group when it was appointed in January, but Fevola was stood down from the group prior to the premiership season for disciplinary reasons.

Squad and player statistics for 2008
Flags represent the state of origin, i.e. the state in which the player played his Under-18s football.

Playing list changes
The following summarises all player changes between the conclusion of the 2007 season and the conclusion of the 2008 season.

Priority draft pick
Having finished second-last in 2007, Carlton received the second selection in each round of the draft. Additionally, the club received a priority draft pick in the National Draft as a result of finishing the 2007 season with a record of 4–18; under the rules in place at the time, priority selections were given to all teams who earned fewer than 16.5 premiership points for the year.

Because Carlton had also received a priority draft pick in the previous season, this season's priority selection was taken before the first round of the draft, rather than before the second round. This gave Carlton the No. 1 draft pick for the third consecutive draft.

Trade for Chris Judd
On 16 September 2007, shortly after his club was eliminated in the semi-finals,  captain Chris Judd announced that he was leaving the club, and intended to return to a club in Melbourne for the remainder of his career. Aged 24, Judd was already a premiership captain, Brownlow Medallist, Norm Smith Medallist and Leigh Matthews Trophy winner with the Eagles, and was arguably the best player in the league at the time.

Judd met with four clubs – Carlton,  and  – and on 2 October 2007, announced that Carlton was his preferred destination, leaving the clubs to negotiate the details of a trade. After informing West Coast early in negotiations that it would not be trading its number one draft pick for Judd, Carlton agreed to trade its first and second round draft picks (No. 3 and 20) and twenty-year-old key position prospect Josh Kennedy (a former No. 4 draft pick) for Judd and a third round draft pick (No. 46).

Delisting of Lance Whitnall
Shortly after trade week, Carlton made the decision to delist captain Lance Whitnall. Whitnall was only 28 years old, and had won the John Nicholls Medal only one season earlier in 2006, but the club was concerned that his degenerative knee injury would limit his output.

In

Out

Season summary

Pre-season matches
Tour of South Africa
In late January and early February, the Carlton and  Football Clubs travelled to South Africa; both clubs held community camps on the tour to promote development of Australian rules football in South Africa, and the tour concluded with an exhibition match in Centurion.

NAB Cup
The NAB Cup preseason competition was played as a sixteen-team knockout tournament in 2008. Carlton was eliminated in the quarter-finals.

NAB Challenge
Following elimination from the NAB Cup, Carlton played two exhibition pre-season matches.

Home-and-away season

Ladder

Leading Goalkickers 
Brendan Fevola was Carlton's leading goalkicker for 2008, kicking 99 goals for the season. It was the sixth consecutive time that Fevola won the club goalkicking. The 99-goal tally was the highest of Fevola's career, but it was not enough to win the Coleman Medal, with 's Lance Franklin kicking 102 goals in the home-and-away season.

Fevola's tally of 99 goals the highest season tally for Carlton history since Alex Jesaulenko's 115 goals in the 1970 season. In addition to his 99 goals at premiership level, Fevola kicked six goals for Victoria in the AFL Hall of Fame Tribute Match.

Team awards and records
Game records
 Round 3 – Carlton's score of 21.8 (134) was its highest losing score since Round 3, 1985.
 Round 4 – Carlton's win against Collingwood was its first win since Round 11, 2007, ending a fourteen-match losing streak. The losing streak was the equal-longest in club history, matching a fourteen-game losing streak in 1901–1902.
 Round 4 – Carlton restricted Collingwood to 13.10 (88), ending a streak of twenty-four consecutive matches in which it had conceded at least 100 points. It was the second-longest such streak by any club in VFL/AFL history, one game short of 's twenty-five game streak from 1992 to 1993.
 Round 7 – Carlton's win against West Coast was its first win outside Victoria since Round 11, 2004, breaking an eighteen-game winless streak which included one draw.
 Round 9 – Carlton defeated  for the first time since Round 16, 2001, ending a nine-match losing streak against the Dockers.
 Round 11 – Carlton recovered from a 30-point deficit at three quarter time to defeat  by 12 points. It was Carlton's largest successful comeback from a three-quarter time deficit since Round 4, 1944, and at that time its equal largest ever.
 Round 21 – Carlton recovered from a 32-point deficit at three quarter time to defeat  by six points. This set a new club record for the largest successful comeback from a three-quarter time deficit.
 Round 21 - Carlton defeated Brisbane for the first time since Round 8, 2001, ending an eight-match losing streak against the Lions.

Season records
Carlton's total score (2217 points) and percentage (94.2%) were both the best that the club had achieved since the 2001 season.
Carlton failed to reach the VFL/AFL finals for the seventh consecutive season, breaking its club record of six seasons, set from 1897 to 1902.

Other

Notable events
Brendan Fevola stood down from the leadership group
On 16 March, less than a week before the opening match of the season, an intoxicated Brendan Fevola was caught urinating outside a Melbourne nightclub. The club demoted Fevola from its leadership group – into which he had been elevated two months earlier – fined him $10,000, and put him on formal notice that no further alcohol-related off-field indiscretion would be tolerated; this ultimatum was ultimately enacted following the 2009 season, when he was traded to  following drunken behaviour at that season's Brownlow Medal Count.

Round 22 – Lance Franklin and Brendan Fevola both within reach of 100 goals
Frankin entered the match with 98 goals, and Fevola with 92 goals.

Franklin reached his 100th goal in the 25th minute of the first quarter, sparking the traditional pitch invasion which delayed play for eight minutes. Fevola was goalless in the first half of the game, scoring two behinds from four opportunities, but then kicked seven of Carlton's eight second-half goals to bring his final tally to 99. Hawthorn had built a game-winning lead by half time, so most of the play in the second half involved Carlton contriving to deliver the ball only to Fevola, and Hawthorn defending him with multiple players.

Prior to that match, Nick Stevens had received a death threat from a man who claimed that he would stab Stevens during the pitch invasion which would follow Franklin's 100th goal; Stevens had received death threats from the man previously, but this was the first one which described a specific threat. Ground security surrounded Stevens during the pitch invasion, and the invasion passed without incident. In 2009, the threats against Stevens – as well as other threats against Andrew McLeod, Scott Lucas and Nathan Thompson – were traced to Eric Rundle; he was found guilty of stalking in May 2009, and was sentenced to 26 months jail.

Individual awards and records

John Nicholls Medal
The Carlton Football Club Best and Fairest awards night took place on 11 September. The John Nicholls Medal, for the best and fairest player of the club, as well as several other awards, were presented on the night.

John Nicholls Medal
A new voting system was introduced for the John Nicholls Medal starting from this year. In each match, as in 2007, the five members of the Match Committee awarded votes; however, starting from this year, each committee member could award votes to up to eight players, and each player could receive up to ten votes from each judge; in previous years, each voter awarded five votes to the best player, four votes to the second-best player, and so on down to one vote for the fifth-best player. The player with the most total votes across all premiership season matches wins the award.

The winner of the John Nicholls Medal was Chris Judd, who polled 472 votes. Judd won the medal in his first season at the club, and it was the first of three John Nicholls Medals that Judd would win consecutively from 2008 to 2010. Judd won comfortably ahead of Marc Murphy (417 votes) and Brendan Fevola (373 votes). The top ten is given below.

Other awards
The following other awards were presented on John Nicholls Medal night:
Best First-Year Player – Matthew Kreuzer
Best Clubman – Andrew Carrazzo
Past Players Encouragement Award – Shaun Grigg
Women of Carlton Player Ambassador of the Year Award – Michael Jamison

Other awards
AFLPA Awards
Chris Judd finished in fifth place in the Leigh Matthews Trophy for 2008.

All-Australian Team
The 40-man squad for the All-Australian Team was announced on 2 September 2008, and the final team of 22 was announced on 15 September 2008. Chris Judd and Brendan Fevola were Carlton's only two nominees, and both were named in the final team, and Judd was named as captain. 
 Brendan Fevola (forward pocket)
 Chris Judd (ruck rover, captain)

AFL Rising Star
Two Carlton players were nominated for the AFL Rising Star award in 2008:
 Matthew Kreuzer – Round 11
 Shaun Grigg – Round 19

Kreuzer ultimately polled eleven votes to finish fourth for the award.

Representative honours
The following Carlton players were selected for representative teams during the 2008 season.

In the AFL Hall of Fame Tribute Match, for Victoria: Brendan Fevola, Chris Judd, Jarrad Waite
In the 2008 International Rules Series, for Australia: Marc Murphy, Kade Simpson

Australian Football Hall of Fame
Alex Jesaulenko, who played 256 games and won four premierships with Carlton between 1967 and 1979, was elevated to the status of Legend in the Australian Football Hall of Fame.

Other
Brendan Fevola won the Allen Aylett Medal as the best on ground in the AFL Hall of Fame Tribute Match.
Kade Simpson won the Jim Stynes Medal as Australia's best player in the 2008 International Rules Series.

Northern Bullants 
The Carlton Football Club had a full affiliation with the Northern Bullants during the 2008 season. It was the sixth season of the clubs' affiliation, which had been in place since 2003. Carlton senior- and rookie-listed players who were not selected to play in the Carlton team were eligible to play for either the Northern Bullants seniors or reserves team, including both Victorian Football League matches. Home games were shared between the Bullants' traditional home ground, Preston City Oval, and Carlton's traditional home ground, Visy Park. Carlton development coach David Teague was appointed as the playing senior coach for the Bullants for the season.

The Bullants finished eighth out of thirteen in the VFL, after being defeated in the elimination final by Casey by five points. Carlton listed player Jason Saddington, who played two games at AFL level during the season, won the Laurie Hill Trophy as the Bullants' best and fairest.

References

Carlton Football Club seasons
2008 in Australian rules football
2008 Australian Football League season